Jawaad Ali Khan is a Hindustani classical vocalist of the Kasur Patiala Gharana.
He was trained in music by his father, Karamat Ali Khan, the elder son of Ustad Bade Ghulam Ali Khan, and from his uncle Ustad Munawar Ali Khan.
Jawaad Ali Khan started his musical career in the early 1980s. He is an A-grade vocalist of All India Radio. He has performed at almost every music conference of India with his elder brother Mazhar Ali Khan.

External links
 Jawaad Ali Khan & Mazhar Ali Khan Official Website

Hindustani singers
Living people
Year of birth missing (living people)